The National Cartography Center of Iran (NCCC) is the main organization for cartography in Iran. 
It is administered and funded by the Government of Iran, as part of the Plan and Budget Organization.
The NCC was established in 1953.

See also
National mapping agency
National Geographical Organization of Iran

References

External links 

Geographic data and information organisations in Iran
Government agencies of Iran
National mapping agencies